Chris Lilygreen (born 9 June 1965) is a Welsh football manager and former professional footballer. A striker, he joined hometown team Newport County in 1983.

Lilygreen is Newport County AFC's leading all time goalscorer with 93 league and cup goals since the club was reformed in 1989.

References

1965 births
Living people
Footballers from Newport, Wales
Welsh footballers
Newport County A.F.C. players
Bath City F.C. players
Yeovil Town F.C. players
English Football League players
Association football forwards
Ebbw Vale F.C. players
Cwmbrân Town A.F.C. players
Chepstow Town F.C. managers
Caldicot Town F.C. managers
Welsh football managers